= Body, Sex, and Pleasure =

1994 non-fiction book by Christine E. Gudorf

Body, Sex, and Pleasure: Reconstructing Christian Sexual Ethics
- Author: Christine E. Gudorf
- Publisher: The Pilgrim Press
- Publication date: 1994
- ISBN: 9780829810141

Body, Sex, and Pleasure: Reconstructing Christian Sexual Ethics is a book by Christine E. Gudorf. It was published in 1994 by The Pilgrim Press.

In the book, Gudorf argues that sexual activity not for the purpose of procreation, such as same-sex relations, masturbation, and sex with contraceptives, is permissible in Christianity.
